White Ribbon Day may refer to:

 "White Ribbon Day" (song), the 1997 and first single released by rock band Delirious?
 6 December, the Canadian National Day of Remembrance and Action on Violence Against Women
 25 November, UN designated International Day for the Elimination of Violence against Women